Wakim is a surname. Notable people with the surname include:

Bishara Wakim (1890–1949), Egyptian director and actor
Chris Wakim, former member of the West Virginia House of Delegates
Najah Wakim (born 1946), president and one of the founders of the Lebanese leftist group the People's Movement
Sam Wakim (born 1937), Canadian lawyer and former Progressive Conservative party member of the Canadian House of Commons

See also
Re Wakim; Ex parte McNally, a significant case decided in the High Court of Australia on 17 June 1999